Sorbus ulleungensis is a species of rowan native to Ulleung Island of South Korea. Its cultivar 'Olympic Flame' has gained the Royal Horticultural Society's Award of Garden Merit as an ornamental. Small white flowers in Spring are followed by bright red berries in the Autumn.

References

ulleungensis
Endemic flora of South Korea
Plants described in 2014